Chandwa, is a community development block in Latehar district, in Indian state of Jharkhand. It is located around 75 km from Ranchi, the state capital. As well as its natural environment, it is known for its bauxite and coal mines. It is mineral rich like most of Jharkhand State. It lies at the junction for the NH39 and NH99 roads, and is also an important railway junction.

Geography

Chandwa Community Block had a population of 81,479 and is the third largest Community Block in Latehar District after Balumath and Latehar respectively. Males constitute 51% of the population and females 49%. Chandwa has an average literacy rate of 41.06%, much lower than the national average of 59.5%: male literacy is 54.91%, and female literacy is 26.58%.

There are a total of 86 villages and 17 panchayats in this Chandwa community block.

Education
1) New Degree College is in under construction
2) New polytechnic college is in under construction
3) Govt. Middle School, Chandwa Situated on NH75 1400 Students 20 Teachers
Hindi is the main language for communication in Chandwa even though a majority of people would speak a dialect coherent with Hindi and a mix of Nagpuriya and Plamau languages. There are 2 government-run middle schools and 3 high schools. One of the high schools is exclusively for Girls and the other two are co educational in nature. SS High school is the oldest of all while Christ Raja High School is regarded prestigious in Palamau Commissionary.

Even though there are not many English medium schools in Chandwa, in the last 10 years, the local educated youth have come forward and set up a few English medium primary schools. Some of the youths have also started a few coaching centers to impart private coaching to the needy students.

Opening of Abhijeet DAV public school about 15 Kilometers from Chandwa town has been a boost for the Chandwa. This has been possible with the effort of Abhijeet Group Power plant. This will be a huge boost to the students and the parents of Chandwa who would otherwise need to send their kids to the Jharkhand state capital Ranchi for getting basic education in English medium.

Abhijeet Group is setting up a Coal Based Thermal Power Plant with total installed capacity of 1740 MW. Several companies signed MoU with the state government but none could start the work in the district prior to Abhijeet Group.

After the development of the power plant and the society other companies started coming to the district with slow pace. Nowadays, the transmigration of the place like Chandwa is legitimate with the socio economic development that has improved multi-times than that it was in 2006.

As the first company in the district of Latehar (highly naxal dominated area) setting up the power plant Abhijeet Group already played a significant role in society, and it also bears a responsibility to help bring about the society of the future.

Economy
The main economy is agriculture and the local business activities that people of chandwa are engaged into.
 
Recently there have been many positive news about a handful of companies like Essar Power, Abhijeet Group  etc. planning to set up power plant projects in the vicinity of Chandwa. 
Power plant project by Abhijeet group has already attained a substantial development and 270 MW of it is on the verge of commissioning. The project situated in "Chakla", about 10 km away from chandwa on Chandwa-Chatra National Highway #99.
Abhijit Group is scheduled to start power generation by 1st quarter 2013.

Essar Power has also started work on 3x600 MW Mega Thermal Power Project (Essar Projects India Limited) situated at 2 km toward east. Near Damodar, Angarah and Essar TPP will be commissioned for two units in 2014.
Few more companies like Adhunik Metaliks, Jindal Power also looking for places to set up their plant and they are considering Chandwa as most suitable place.

The local business has got a boost in the recent times with the coming of Abhijeet Group and Essar Group in the local area. In the main town, the rental prices of homes and office spaces have been soaring and the local people have adopted this as a good money earning business plan.

Places of interest
Local places of interest include:
 Maa Nagar Bhagwati Temple: This is a temple situated in the "Nagar" village at the foot of the mountains about 8 km away from the center of Chandwa town in Chandwa-Chatara main road. A Marriage Hall has also been built up there as this temple hosts many marriages during the marriage season every year. Religious people from Chandwa town visit the temple on a regular basis. It comes under the Tori Pargana which was ruled by the Raja's of Tori Estate. 
 Kranti Fall: This waterfall is located in the Amjharia Ghati and once it used to be a picnic spot but now it is now largely abandoned.
 Hindalco Park: About 5 km from Chandwa town on the Chandwa-Ranchi Road. This park has been developed and maintained by Hindalco industries and serves as a picnic spot for the people of Chandwa town especially on the arrival of new year (1 January).
 Lah Bagan: There is one a Lah Park, a government organization park, which produce as much Lah. These are used to make an Outer structure of aeroplane.
 Church: A Catholic church situated near Block Headquarter Chandwa and another Menonnite church situated in Kusum Toli Chandwa.
 27 No. Pool: One of the highest railway bridge over Mogaldaha river. A picnic spot near Chandwa block. People from different places come and visit this place.

Transport

Road
Chandwa is well connected to the nearby major towns of Jharkhand Chatra, Daltonganj, Lohardaga, Gumla and the state capital Ranchi by road. The national highway NH-75(Now NH 39) connecting State capital Ranchi to the Palamau headquarter Daltonganj via Chandwa town is undergoing the widening currently and it would be a major relief for the local people for commuting to Ranchi and Daltonganj. The common mode of transport usually is privately run buses and other vehicles. Another national highway NH-99(Now NH-22) is connecting to Dobhi (NH-2) and Chandwa via Chatra

Rail
Chandwa has a railway station which is known as TORI Junction. Trains to National Capital Delhi go through this station and due to lack of railway infrastructure in the other nearby towns, TORI serves as a common railway station for many people. Train services to Dhanbad, New Delhi, Patna, Ranchi, Varanasi, Rourkela, Jammu, Jaipur, Bhopal, Jabalpur, Tatanagar, Howrah, Lohardaga are available on a daily basis from Tori Junction station.

Tori Station is Railway Junction as the new rail route from Lohardaga connected here. A railway line is also proposed to connect Chatra and Hazaribagh from Tori later in the future.

Air
The nearest airport for Chandwa is Birsa Munda Airport at the state capital Ranchi (75 km) by road and by trains via Lohardaga it is about 111 km.

Healthcare
There is one Government hospital near the Chandwa Daltonganj Mod (road turn).  Some doctors run their own private clinics in the town. The nearest hospitals are:
 Tumbagadha in Palamau
 Sadar Hospital in Lohardaga
 Mandar Hospital
 Primary Hospital Chandwa

Sports
Cricket is the primary sport in Chandwa. The ground of Raja Cricket Club, Kamta, is the main playing ground for the local children and boys, SS High School is another playing ground for cricket and football also.  Tennis ball cricket is the primary version of cricket that is played there, and local tournaments day/night are held annually.

Apart from cricket, other sports popular in Chandwa include hockey, football, and badminton.

Entertainment
There is no cinema in Chandwa town. The nearest cinemas are Manmati Chitra Mandir in district headquarters Latehar and Alka and Menka Cinema Halls in Lohardaga. Local residents rely on television and a few privately run Video centers in the town. There are also a lot of eateries and pubs. It also has a gym with swimming pool, sauna and spa.
There are three restaurants in the town - Matrichaya, Muskaan and Food Safari.

References

External links
https://web.archive.org/web/20070927182506/http://envfor.nic.in/divisions/cltech/Damodar/1.1.htm
http://in.news.yahoo.com/070820/32/6jopc.html
https://web.archive.org/web/20090425150722/http://latehar.nic.in/overview.htm
https://web.archive.org/web/20110216214830/http://www.hindustantimes.com/Chandwa-town-doesn-t-sleep-at-6-anymore/Article1-601053.aspx

Latehar district
Community development blocks in Jharkhand
Community development blocks in Latehar district
Cities and towns in Latehar district